Monsters of the Universe: Come Out and Plague is the sixth studio album by horror punk musician Wednesday 13. The album was released on January 12, 2015 in the UK and January 13, 2015, in the US and is Wednesday's first concept album. It will be released on CD and limited edition Double Vinyl. The album features 5 tracks co-written by Wednesday 13 and Roman Surman along with 1 track written entirely by Surman which is a first for a Wednesday 13 album that another band member has written an entire track without a co-credit from Wednesday.

Background
Wednesday posted a vlog on the official DevCo Entertainment, LLC. Vimeo channel detailing the album's release. He stated that he wanted to do something different and more challenging and spent 8 months with his guitar and wrote songs that all ended up piecing together into a story which will be the basis of the album. For details on the concept Wednesday stated “Take the movies, They Live and Night Of The Living Dead, and the series V, and mix that together. It’s a sci-fi, horror story that will be the most unique Wednesday 13 album to date. I wouldn’t even compare it to anything I’ve done in the past.” He also stated the CD and Double Vinyl releases will have completely different artworks to each other. Wednesday 13 has featured several album covers on his Facebook page and allows fans to customize their album cover by naming their monster and other details.

On October 31, 2014, Wednesday uploaded the first single for the new album to his official SoundCloud account entitled "Come Out And Plague".

The Monsters of the Universe
Like with previous Wednesday 13 albums where he offered fans their names in the booklet on gravestones and royal ghouls appearing in artwork he has offered 13 fans the opportunity to name the 13 monsters, planets and lifeforms that would be appearing in the CD booklet on his MorgueThanMerch store. Also included in the deal was a signed 8x10 print of the artwork from artist David Frizell & Wednesday 13 + a signed copy of the Monsters of the Universe CD. It is unknown at this time whether these "Monsters of the Universe" will be mentioned in the songs under the names given by the fans. All monsters were drawn and completed on September 25, 2014.

Limited edition preorder releases
On Wednesday's official "Morgue Than Merch" store he offered several limited editions of the album only available through the official store. These included:
 The CD and Double VINYL along with the buyer's name appearing in the CD booklet. - Limited to 100
 Limited edition VINYL record. - Limited to 900
 The CD and Double VINYL along with a hand-written lyric book for the album with ideas, notes drawings made during recording sessions all written by Wednesday himself.
 The CD and Double VINYL along with the buyer's name in the CD booklet, custom painted paper mache masks painted by Wednesday himself, a "toxic plague handprint" with lyrics of the buyer's choice and autographed. - Limited to 13
 Monsters of the Universe: Name Your Monster - Limited to 13.

Track listing

Charts

Personnel
 Wednesday 13 - lead vocals, additional guitar 
 Roman Surman - lead guitar, backing vocals
 Jack Tankersley - rhythm guitar, backing vocals
 Troy Doebbler - bass, backing vocals
 Jason West - drums

References

2015 albums
Wednesday 13 albums
Concept albums